Zym (in Albanian) is a village in the Prizren Municipality of southwestern Kosovo.

Geography
The settlement lies in the eastern part of the Has region in Kosovo, known as Prizren Has (the other being Gjakova Has).

History
In the Ottoman Defter of 1485, Zym was part of the Nahiya of Pashtrik, and it was also known as Zybofic. The inhabitants of Zym had an overwhelmingly Christian Albanian anthroponomy with a degree of Islamisation: Ali Kola, Biba Gjoni, Nina Koka, Gjin Dusha, Baç Prendi, Doda Tita (Dida), Bac Doçi, Kosta Shtefani, Gjec Doçi, Koka Peka, Prend Nina, Gika Marku, Prend Andrea, Doç Daba, Deja Papa, Gika Daka, Gjec Gika, Papa Doçi, Deda Prendi, Iljas Doda, Gjin Doçi, Koka Papa, Tita (Dida) Deja, Prend Papa, Gjon Papa, Mark Deja. There were 21 homes in total.

During the Kingdom of Yugoslavia, Zym was the center of a srez (municipality). In 1970, the village had 122 Albanian houses, hailing from Shkodër Malësia (77 houses), Eastern Malësia (6 houses) and from Mirditë (39 houses), their ancestors having settled here during the 18th century.

During FR Yugoslavia (Serbia and Montenegro), the settlement was known as Zjum Has (Зјум Хас, Zym i Hasit), in order to differentiate from Zjum Opoljski in Opolje. Zjum Opoljski was founded by settlers from Zjum Has.

Demographics
According to the 2011 census, it had 1,782 inhabitants, all of whom declared as Albanians.

Notes

References

Sources

External links
Accuweather
Travel information

Villages in Prizren